A scholar of the history of British political discourse, J. G. A. Pocock, the Harry C. Black Chair of History Emeritus at Johns Hopkins University, has enjoyed over 60 years of publication. Now in his tenth decade, he recently concluded Barbarism and Religion, a six-volume study of Edward Gibbon, author of The History of the Decline and Fall of the Roman Empire. The first two volumes of B&R were awarded the American Philosophical Society's Jacques Barzun Prize in Cultural History for the year 1999.
 
In total, Pocock has published more than 260 articles, essays, and reviews. Below are the main categories of his articles/essays and their constituents. Pocock's many monographs are listed within the main article, J. G. A. Pocock: Monographs.

Edward Gibbon
Pocock used many of the following as research and preparation for Barbarism and Religion :

"Between Machiavelli and Hume: Gibbon as Civic Humanist and Philosophical Historian," Daedulus 105,3(1976), 153–169.
"Gibbon's Decline and Fall and the World View of the Late Enlightenment," Eighteenth Century Studies 10,3(1977), 287–303.
"Gibbon and the Shepherds: the Stages of Society in the Decline and Fall," History of European Ideas 2,3(1981), 193–202.
"Superstition and Enthusiasm in Gibbon’s History of Religion*," Eighteenth Century Life 8,1(1982), 83–94.
"Review of Gossman, Lionel: The Empire Unpossess'd: an Essay on Gibbon's Decline and Fall," History of European Ideas 4,2(1983), 223–225.
"Edward Gibbon in History: Aspects of the Text in 'The History of the Decline and Fall of the Roman Empire'," in The Tanner Lectures on Human Values, vol. XI, ed. Grethe B. Petersen. (Salt Lake City: Univ. of Utah Press, 1988), 289–364.
"Gibbon and the Idol Fo: Chinese and Christian History in the Enlightenment," in Sceptics, Millenarians and Jews, eds. David S. Katz, Jonathan Israel. (Leiden: E.J. Brill, 1990), 15–34.
 "Review of Womersley, David: The Transformation of the Decline and Fall of the Roman Empire," Eighteenth-Century Studies 233,3(Spring	1990), 318–322.
 "Tangata Whenua and Enlightenment Anthropology," in The Discovery of Islands (originally published, 1991). J. G. A. Pocock: Monographs.  
"Classical and Civil History: the Transformation of Humanism," Cromohs 1(1996), 1–34; .
"Gibbon and the Primitive Church," in History, Religion and Culture: British Intellectual History 1750–1950, eds. Stefan Collini, Richard Whatmore, Brian Young. (Cambridge: 2000), 48–68.
"The 'Outlines of the History of the World': a Problematic Essay by Edward Gibbon," in Historians and Ideologues: essays in honour of Donald R. Kelley, eds. Anthony Grafton; J.H.M. Salmon. (Rochester, N.Y.: Univ. of Rochester Press, 2001), 211–230.
"The Ironist" (Review of Womersley, David: Gibbon and 'The Watchmen of the Holy City': the Historian and his Reputation 1776–1815). London Review of Books 24,22(14 – Nov 2002), 13–17.
"Gibbon and the History of Heresy," in Histories of Heresy in Early Modern Europe: For, Against, and Beyond Persecution and Toleration, ed. John Christian Laursen. (New York: Palgrave Macmillan Pubs., 2002), 205–220.
"Edward Gibbon and Clerical Scholarship," in The Making of Marsh's Library: learning, politics and religion in Ireland, 1650–1750, eds. Muriel McCarthy; Ann Simmons. (Dublin; Portland, Oreg.: Four Courts Press, Dec. 2004), 32–40.
"Perceptions of Modernity in Early Modern Historical Thinking," Intellectual History Review 17,1(2007), 55–63.
"Historiography and Enlightenment: a View of their History," Modern Intellectual History 5(2008), 83–96.
"Gibbon and the Invention of Gibbon: Chapters 15 and 16 Reconsidered," History of European Ideas 35(2009), 209–216.

Machiavelli and James Harrington
"Interregnum: the Oceana of James Harrington," chapter 6 in The Ancient Constitution and the Feudal Law (1957;1987). J. G. A. Pocock: Monographs.
"Machiavelli, Harrington, and English Political Ideologies in the Eighteenth Century," William and Mary Quarterly, 3rd ser. 22,4(1965), 549–583.
"'The Onely Politician': Machiavelli, Harrington and Felix Raab." Historical Studies: Australia and New Zealand 12,4(1966), 265–296.
"James Harrington and the Good Old Cause: a study of the ideological context of his writings," Journal of British Studies 10(Nov.1970),30–48.
 "Custom & Grace, Form & Matter: an Approach to Machiavelli's Concept of Innovation," in Machiavelli and the Nature of Political Thought, ed. Martin Fleisher. (New York: Atheneum, 1972), 153–184.
"Prophet and Inquisitor: Or, a Church Built upon Bayonets Cannot Stand: A Comment on Mansfield's 'Strauss's Machiavelli'," Political Theory 3,4(Nov.1975), 385–401.
"Historical Introduction," The Political Works of James Harrington (Cambridge: 1977), 1–152.
"Contexts for the Study of James Harrington," Il Pensiero Politico 11,1(1978), 20–35.
"Machiavelli and Guicciardini: Ancients and Moderns," Canadian Journal of Political and Social Theory 2,3 (Fall 1978), 93–109.
"The Machiavellian Moment Revisited: A Study in History and Ideology," Journal of Modern History 53 (March 1981), 49–72.
"Machiavelli and the Liberal Cosmos," Political Theory 13,4 (Nov. 1985), 559–574.
"Preface" and "Introduction," James Harrington: The Commonwealth of Oceana and a System of Politics (Cambridge: 1992), vi–xxvi.
"Machiavelli and the Rethinking of History," Il Pensiero Politico 27,2(1994), 215–230.
"Afterword," The Machiavellian Moment: Florentine Political Thought and the Atlantic Republican Tradition (Princeton: 2003 ed.), 553–583.

New Zealand (Aotearoa)
Pocock is a New Zealand expatriate, but he retains his citizenship and maintains an interest in his country's past, present, and future: 
 "Introduction," in Pocock, ed., The Maori and New Zealand Politics (1965), 1–13. J. G. A. Pocock: Monographs.
 "The History and Historiography of New Zealand Universities," New Zealand Journal of Educational Studies 8,2(1973), 177–187.
"History and Sovereignty: The Historiographical Response to Europeanization in Two British Cultures," Journal of British Studies 30(Oct.1992), 358–389.
"Removal from the Wings" (Review of Belich, James: Making Peoples: a History of the New Zealanders from Polynesian Settlement to the End of the Nineteenth Century), London Review of Books 19,6 (20 March 1997), 12–13. 
"Asia and the Pacific" (a second review of Belich [above]), The Historian 60,4 (Summer 1998), 884–886.
"Waitangi as Mystery of State: Consequences of the Ascription of Federative Capacity to the Maori," in Political Theory and the Rights of Indigenous Peoples, eds. Duncan Ivison et al. (Cambridge: 2000), 25–35.
"The Treaty between Histories," in History, Power and Loss: uses of the past—a New Zealand commentary, eds., Andrew Sharp, et al.  (Wellington, N.Z.: Bridget Williams Books, 2001), 75–95.
"The Uniqueness of Aotearoa," Proceedings of the American Philosophical Society 145,4 (Dec. 2001), 482–487.
"The Antipodean Perception,"  in The Discovery of Islands.  J. G. A. Pocock: Monographs.
"Law, Sovereignty and History in a Divided Culture: the case of New Zealand and the Treaty of Waitangi," in Discovery of Islands; originally published, 1992.
"Tangata Whenua and Enlightenment Anthropology," in Discovery of Islands; originally published, 1991.
"Rangatiratanga" (Review of two books by Binney, Judith: Encircled lands: Te Urewera, 1820–1921 and Stories without end: essays, 1975–2000), London Review of Books 33,17 (8 September 2011), 26–27.

America
 "Virtue and Commerce in the Eighteenth Century" (Review of Wood, Gordon: Creation of the American Republic; Stourzh, Gerald: Alexander Hamilton and the Idea of Republican Government), Journal of Interdisciplinary History 3(Summer, 1972), 119–134.
 "1776: the Revolution against Parliament," in Three British Revolutions, (1980), 265–288. J. G. A. Pocock: Monographs.
 "English and European Political Inheritance," Encyclopedia of American Political History: Studies of the Principal Movements and Ideas, vol.2, ed. Jack P. Greene. (New York: Chas. Scribner's Sons, 1984), 513–534.	
 "The Influence of British Political Thought on the American Constitution: Magna Carta in Context," in The Blessings of Liberty: Bicentennial Lectures at the National Archives, eds. Robert S. Peck; Ralph S. Pollock. (Chicago: American Bar Association, 1985), 11–19.
 "Hume and the American Revolution: the dying thoughts of a North Briton," in Virtue, Commerce and History (1985). J. G. A. Pocock: Monographs.
 "Between Gog and Magog: the Republican Thesis and the 'Ideologia Americana'," Journal of the History of Ideas 48,2(1987), 325–346.
 "States, Republics and Empires: The American Founding in Early Modern Perspective," Social Science Quarterly 68,4(Dec. 1987), 703–723.
 "Introduction," in Conceptual Change and the Constitution (1998). J. G. A. Pocock: Monographs.
 "The Book Most Misunderstood Since the Bible: John Adams and the Confusion about Aristocracy," Fra Toscana e Stati Uniti: il Discorso Politico nell' Eta della Constituzione Americana: atti del convegno: Pensiero politico toscano e pensiero politico-istituzionale americano (Florence, 1989), 181–201.
 "Enlightenment and revolution: the case of English-speaking North America," Transactions of the Seventh International Congress on the Enlightenment, vol. 1, (Voltaire Foundation, 1989), 249–261.
 "The Idea of Constitutionalism," in Constitutionalism: the American experiment in wider perspective. (Cambridge, Mass.: Harvard Law School, 1989).
 "Review of Kramnick, Isaac: Republicanism and Bourgeois Radicalism: Political Ideology in Late Eighteenth-Century England and America," Eighteenth Century Studies 25,2(1991), 219–227.
 "Empire, State and Confederation: the War of American Independence as a Crisis in Multiple Monarchy," (1995) in The Discovery of Islands (2005). J. G. A. Pocock: Monographs.
 "Empire, revolution and an end of early modernity," in Varieties of British Political Thought (1996). J. G. A. Pocock: Monographs.
"Religious Freedom and the Desacralization of Politics: from the English Civil Wars to the Virginia Statute," in The Virginia Statute for Religious Freedom: its Evolution and Consequences in American History, eds. Merrill D. Peterson; Robert C. Vaughan. (Cambridge, 1998), 43–73.	
 "America's Foundations, Foundationalisms and Fundamentalisms," Orbis 48,1(Winter, 2004), 37–44.
 "The American Founding," in Approaches to Political Thought, ed. William L. Richter (Lanham, MD: Rowman and Littlefield, 2009), pp. 173–78.

Political languages (contextualism)
"The History of Political Thought: a Methodological Enquiry," Philosophy, Politics and Society, 2nd ser., eds. Peter Laslett; W. G. Runciman (New York: Barnes and Noble, Inc., 1962), 183–202.
"The Origins of Study of the Past: a Comparative Approach," Comparative Studies in Society and History 4,2(1962), 209–246.
"Verbalizing a Political Act: Towards a Politics of Speech," Political Theory 1,1(Feb.1973), 27–45.
"On the Problem of Methodology: a Comment on Ashcraft," Political Theory 3,3(Aug.1975), 317–318.
"Reconstructing the Traditions: Quentin Skinner's Historians' History of Political Thought," Canadian Journal of Political and Social Theory 3,3 (Fall 1979), 95–112.
"Political Ideas as Historical Events: Political Philosophers as Historical Actors," Political Theory and Political Education, ed. Melvin Richter, (Princeton: 1980), 139–158.
"Political Theory, History, and Myth: a Salute to John Gunnell," Annals of Scholarship 1,1(1980), 3–25.
"Virtues, Rights, and Manners: A Model for Historians of Political Thought," Political Theory 9,3(Aug. 1981), 353–368. also in Virtue, Commerce, and History. see J. G. A. Pocock: Monographs.
"Intentions, Traditions and Methods: some sounds on a fog-horn," Annals of Scholarship 1,4(1981), 57–62.
"The Reconstruction of Discourse: Towards the Historiography of Political Thought," MLN 96,5(Dec.1981), 959–980.
"Trading Traditions: a Report from the High Barbary," Annals of Scholarship 3,3(1985), 103–111.
"A New Bark Up an Old Tree," Intellectual History Newsletter 8(Apr.1986), 3–9.
"Texts as Events: Reflections on the History of Political Thought," in Politics of Discourse: the Literature and History of Seventeenth-Century England, eds. Kevin Sharpe; Steven N. Zwicker, (Los Angeles: Univ. of California Press, 1987), 21–34.
"The Concept of a Language and the métier d'historien: some considerations on practice," in  The Languages of Political Theory in Early-modern Europe, ed. Anthony Pagden, (Cambridge: 1987), 19–38.
"What is Intellectual History?" in What is History Today?  ed. Juliet Gardiner, (London: Macmillan, 1988), 114–116.
"From Languages to Pedagogy" (comment on Rebecca Bushnell, From Books to Languages), Common Knowledge 3,1(1994), p. 39.
"Concepts and Discourses: a difference in culture? Comment on a paper by Melvin Richter," in The meaning of historical terms and concepts: new studies on Begriffsgeschichte, eds. Hartmut Lehmann;  Melvin Richter, (Wash., DC: German Historical Institute, 1996), 47–58.
"Quentin Skinner: The History of Politics and the Politics of History," Common Knowledge 10,3(Aug.2004), 532–550.
"Propriety, Liberty and Valour: Ideology, Rhetoric and Speech in the 1628 Debates in the House of Commons," in D.N. DeLuna, ed., listed below (2006), 231–260.
"Present at the Creation: with Laslett to the Lost Worlds," International Journal of Public Affairs 2(2006), 7–17. [annual pub.]
"Theory in History: Problems of Context and Narrative," chapter 8 of The Oxford Handbook of Political Theory, eds. John S. Dryzek et al. (Oxford: 2006), 163–174.
"Foundations and Moments," chap. 3 in Rethinking the Foundations of Modern Political Thought, eds. Annabel Brett, James Tully with Holly Hamilton-Bleakley (Cambridge: 2006), 37–49.
"The History of British Political Thought: a Field and its Futures," chap. 1 in British Political Thought in History, Literature and Theory, 1500–1800, ed. David Armitage (Cambridge: 2006), 10–19.  co-authors: Gordon Schochet and Lois G. Schwoerer.
"The Atlantic Republican Tradition: The Republic of the Seven Provinces," Republics of Letters: A Journal for the Study of Knowledge, Politics, and the Arts v.2, no.1 (01 December 2010): https://arcade.stanford.edu/rofl/atlantic-republican-tradition-republic-seven-provinces/ .

Monographs
 J. G. A. Pocock: Monographs

Notes

Further reading
 D. N. DeLuna, ed.; P. Anderson, G. Burgess, assts. The Political Imagination in History: Essays concerning J.G.A. Pocock (Baltimore: Owlworks, 2006); . cited above.

Bibliographies of New Zealand writers